Ella Palis (born 24 March 1999) is a French professional footballer who plays as a midfielder for Division 1 Féminine club Bordeaux and the France national team.

Club career
A youth academy graduate of Guingamp, Palis made her senior team debut on 16 October 2016 in a 2–2 draw against Bordeaux. In June 2020, she joined Bordeaux on a three-year deal.

International career
Palis is a former French youth international. She was captain of French under-19 team at 2018 UEFA Women's Under-19 Championship.

In February 2021, Palis received maiden call-up to France senior team for 2021 Tournoi de France. On 23 February, she made her debut in a 2–0 win against Switzerland.

Personal life
Palis is younger sister of Drakkars de Caen player Alexandre Palis.

Career statistics

International

References

External links
 
 Ella Palis at footofeminin.fr 
 

1999 births
Living people
Women's association football midfielders
French women's footballers
France women's youth international footballers
France women's international footballers
Division 1 Féminine players
En Avant Guingamp (women) players
FC Girondins de Bordeaux (women) players
Footballers from Seine-et-Marne
UEFA Women's Euro 2022 players